2012 Guo Shou-Jing, provisional designation , is a carbonaceous asteroid and Florian interloper from the inner regions of the asteroid belt, approximately 13 kilometers in diameter. It was discovered on 9 October 1964, by astronomers at the Purple Mountain Observatory in Nanking, China. The asteroid was named after Chinese astronomer Guo Shoujing.

Orbit and classification 

Guo Shou-Jing orbits the Sun at a distance of 1.9–2.7 AU once every 3 years and 7 months (1,298 days). Its orbit has an eccentricity of 0.18 and an inclination of 3° with respect to the ecliptic. The body's observation arc begins 11 years prior to its official discovery observation, with a precovery taken at Palomar Observatory in August 1953.

Florian interloper 

Guo Shou-Jing is a dark, carbonaceous asteroid but possesses the orbital characteristics of a member of the Flora family, which is one of the largest groups of bright, stony S-type asteroids in the main-belt. It is therefore thought to be an unrelated interloper that does not origin from the Flora family's parent body.

Physical characteristics 

Guo Shou-Jing has been characterized as a carbonaceous C-type asteroid by Pan-STARRS photometric survey.

Fragmentary lightcurve 

In August 2010, a fragmentary rotational lightcurve of Guo Shou-Jing was obtained from photometric observations by French amateur astronomer René Roy . Lightcurve analysis gave a rotation period of 12 hours with a brightness variation of 0.05 magnitude.

Diameter and albedo 

According to the surveys carried out by the Japanese Akari satellite, and the NEOWISE mission of NASA's Wide-field Infrared Survey Explorer, Guo Shou-Jing measures between 11.65 and 14.70 kilometers in diameter and its surface has a low albedo between 0.030 and 0.070.

Based on purely orbital criteria, the Collaborative Asteroid Lightcurve Link (erroneously) assumes an albedo of 0.24 – derived from 8 Flora, the largest member and namesake of the Flora family – and subsequently calculates a smaller diameter of 5.67 kilometers.

Naming 

This minor planet was named after Chinese astronomer and engineer Guo Shoujing (1231–1316) who lived during the Yuan Dynasty. He designed and constructed several astronomical instruments for precise observations and has been called the "Tycho Brahe of China". The official  was published by the Minor Planet Center on 1 August 1978.

References

External links 
 Asteroid Lightcurve Database (LCDB), query form (info )
 Dictionary of Minor Planet Names, Google books
 Asteroids and comets rotation curves, CdR – Observatoire de Genève, Raoul Behrend
 Discovery Circumstances: Numbered Minor Planets (1)-(5000) – Minor Planet Center
 
 

002012
002012
Named minor planets
19641009